This is a list of Dutch football transfers for the 2020–21 winter transfer window. Only transfers featuring Eredivisie are listed.

Eredivisie

Note: Flags indicate national team as has been defined under FIFA eligibility rules. Players may hold more than one non-FIFA nationality.

ADO Den Haag

In:

Out:

Ajax

In:

Out:

AZ

In:

Out:

Emmen

In:

Out:

Feyenoord

In:

Out:

Fortuna Sittard

In:

Out:

Groningen

In:

Out:

Heerenveen

In:

Out:

Heracles

In:

Out:

PSV

In:

Out:

RKC Waalwijk

In:

Out:

Sparta Rotterdam

In:

Out:

Twente

In:

Out:

Utrecht

In:

Out:

Vitesse

In:

Out:

VVV-Venlo

In:

Out:

Willem II

In:

Out:

Zwolle

In:

Out:

References

External links
 Official site of the KNVB
 Official site of the Eredivisie

Football transfers winter 2020–21
Transfers
2020-21